Rajdharpur  is a village in Rajbari District, Bangladesh, part of Baliakandi Upazila and Islampur Union.

References
 Bangladesh Population Census- 2001, Community Series; District: Rajbari | November 2006 | Bangladesh Bureau of Statistics, Planning Division, Ministry of Planning, Government of the People's Republic of Bangladesh.
 Bangladesh Development Acceleration Organization, (BDAO)

Villages in Rajbari District